Eremophila arbuscula is a plant in the figwort family, Scrophulariaceae and is endemic to part of the Grey Range in the south-west of Queensland in Australia. It is a small tree with rough bark and long, soft, silvery-grey leaves which have an unpleasant odour when crushed.

Description
The leaves have an unpleasant odour when crushed.

There are 5 blunt, egg-shaped, cream-coloured or purplish sepals covered on both surfaces with hairs. The petal tube is white and hairy on the outside and spotted bright yellow or orange on the inside. The middle lobe of the tube is yellow on the inside surface. There are four stamens which extend slightly beyond the end of the tube.

Taxonomy and naming
The species was first formally described by Robert Chinnock in 2007 and the description was published in Eremophila and allied genera : a monograph of the plant family Myoporaceae. The specific epithet (arbuscula) is derived from the "Latin arbuscula, a small tree".

Distribution and habitat
This eremophila is only known from the Grey Range in the Warrego district in Queensland, where it grows on stony ridges in woodland.

Conservation status
Eremophila arbuscula is classified by the Queensland Government as of "least concern".

Use in horticulture
This eremophila is an impressive large shrub in garden situations with its trunk giving the appearance of an old, gnarled tree with fissured bark, even when relatively young. Its silvery-grey leaves and massed, scented flowers are a highlight in summer. It can be grown form seed and cuttings, although with difficulty and is often grafted onto Myoporum species. It will grow in most situations and is drought resistant and reasonably frost tolerant.

References

arbuscula
Flora of Queensland
Plants described in 2007
Taxa named by Robert Chinnock